Union for the Nation is a political party in Benin. The general secretary of the party (as of 2000) is Alexandre Hountondji.

Political parties in Benin
Political parties with year of establishment missing